Cloud Top is a 30-story,  tall residential twin skyscraper complex located in Xinyi Special District, Taipei, Taiwan. The complex used to be the tallest residential skyscrapers in Taipei when completed in 1997. Built under strict requirements of preventing damage caused by earthquakes and typhoons common on the island, the residential complex provides 195 units of luxury apartments, offering unobstructed views of Taipei 101 and Xinyi District.

See also 
 List of tallest buildings in Taipei
 Tao Zhu Yin Yuan
 One Park Taipei
 55 Timeless

References

1997 establishments in Taiwan
Residential skyscrapers in Taiwan
Skyscrapers in Taipei
Apartment buildings in Taiwan
Residential buildings completed in 1997